A law of Ukraine is primary legislation in Ukraine adopted by the Verkhovna Rada and signed by the president. Laws of Ukraine support and supplement the fundamental law of country, Constitution of Ukraine. Some laws were codified into Civil Code, Criminal Code and so on.

For procedural reasons Verkhovna Rada also issues resolutions that explain how legal documents should be presented to parliament. Bills are usually considered by the Verkhovna Rada following the procedure of three readings; the President of Ukraine must sign a law before it can be officially promulgated. After laws are published in Holos Ukrayiny they come into force officially the next day. The Verkhovna Rada can take the decision on final adoption of the bill after the first or second reading if the bill is considered as such that does not require refinement. It can also apply the rare procedure of the second first reading, which opens the possibility for a radical revision of the bill, its structure, and key provisions.

Codified Laws
There are over 20 codices of law that are active in Ukraine.
 Air[space] Code (2011, 1993)
 Tax Code (2010)
 Budget Code (2010, 2001)
 Code of Administrative Proceedings (2005)
 Civil Procedural Code (2004, 1963)
 Criminal Executive Code (2003)
 Civil Code (2003, 1963)
 Economic Code (2003)
 Customs Code (2002, 1991)
 Family Code (2002)
 Land Code (2001, 1990, 1970)
 Criminal Code (2001, 1960)
 Water Code (1995, 1972)
 Maritime Code (1995)
 Code on Subsoil (bowels of the Earth) (1994)
 Forest Code (1994)
 Economic Procedural Code (1991)
 Code on Administrative Offenses (1984)
 Residential Code (1983) 
 Labor Code (1971)
 Criminal Procedural Code (1960)

Inactive Codes
 Correctional Labor Code (1970)
 Code on Marriage and Family (1969)

Important State Laws
 On Legal Succession of Ukraine

Secondary legislation
All bodies of executive power issue their own secondary legislation.
 President - decree (ukase)
 Cabinet - resolution (rarely decree)
 other - orders

See also
Legislation on languages in Ukraine
Electoral legislation of Ukraine

Notes

References

External links
 Legislation of Ukraine (Verkhovna Rada website)
 List of important legal documents at the Procuracy of Ukraine website
 Legislation of Ukraine
 List of laws

Government of Ukraine
Politics of Ukraine
Law of Ukraine